Grotbags is a children's television programme which ran for three series between 1991 and 1993 about a fictional witch named Grotbags, a spin-off of multiple earlier Rod Hull and Emu shows. Very much in the mould of the traditional pantomime villain, Grotbags was played by actress, singer and comedian Carol Lee Scott in a costume comprising vivid green make-up and wig and a witch's cape and hat. Each episode co-starred Francis Wright and Richard Coombs in multiple puppet roles.

Premise
The character Grotbags originally appeared in the Rod Hull television show Emu's World in 1982 and she remained the principal antagonist throughout the rest of the decade in the programme's various other incarnations (Emu's All Live Pink Windmill Show, Emu's Wide World, and 1989's EMU-TV), plus the subsequent animated series Rod 'n' Emu. In 1991, Central Independent Television awarded Grotbags her own solo spin-off, which was created by Carol Lee Scott and puppeteer Richard Coombs, written by Bob Hescott, and directed by Colin Clews.

A total of 29 episodes were made, with each revolving around Grotbags and her minions at Gloomy Fortress and their day-to-day lives.

Principal characters
 Grotbags: self-styled "Bestest witch in the whole wide world"
 Colin the Bat: a stupid bat who cannot fly very well 
 Doris the Dodo: the last dodo, rescued by Grotbags from a desert island
 Norman Nettle: a grumpy nettle plant
 Grumble: Grotbags's cauldron
 Lumpy: a mass of left-over spells who lives in Grumble

Transmission guide
 Series 1: 13 editions from 4 September 1991 – 18 December 1991
 Series 2: 10 editions from 9 September 1992 – 11 November 1992
 Series 3: 6 editions from 6 January 1993 – 10 February 1993

References

External links
 Grotbags Official Website
 Grotbags at Internet Movie Database
 Carol Lee Scott (Grotbags) Official Myspace

1991 British television series debuts
1993 British television series endings
1990s British children's television series
British children's fantasy television series
British television shows featuring puppetry
British television spin-offs
English-language television shows
ITV children's television shows
Television series about witchcraft
Television series by ITV Studios
Television shows produced by Central Independent Television